Debe Nek is a town in Amahlathi Local Municipality in the Eastern Cape province of South Africa.

Debe Nek's location is 19 km northwest of King William's Town and 38 km east of Alice. Debe Nek takes its name from the Debe (Khoekhoen for 'brackish') River, from the defile ('nek') through which the Debe River flows. This was the site of the Battle of Amalinda between Ndlambe and Gaika in 1818. It is now a health resort. The area is found in the Middledrift Road near Dimbaza

References

Populated places in the Amahlathi Local Municipality